Phillip Chen (born April 22, 1978) is an American politician and member of the California State Assembly. He is a Republican representing the 55th district, encompassing small parts of Los Angeles, Orange, and San Bernardino Counties.  The district includes the cities of Diamond Bar, Rowland Heights, Brea, Yorba Linda, and Chino Hills. Prior to being elected to the state assembly, he was a school board trustee for the Walnut Valley Unified School District.

Early life 
Chen graduated from Servite High School in Anaheim.

Education 
In 2002, Chen earned his B.A. in Communications from California State University, Fullerton. In 2005, Chen earned a Master of Public Administration degree from USC. In 2014, Chen earned a Doctoral of Educational Psychology from the USC.

Career 
Chen is the owner of a property management company.

In 2013, Chen became an Adjunct Faculty Professor at the USC Sol Price School of Public Policy.

From 1999 to 2003, Chen was a member of USAWKF National Wushu Taolu Team and represented the United States at the World Wushu Championships and the Pan American Wushu Championships. He also became an official judge for the USAWKF. Chen also started the first Wushu Chinese martial art course for credit at California State University Fullerton.

Chen is a former Los Angeles County Reserve Sheriff’s Deputy. Chen was appointed by former Governor Pete Wilson to the Governor’s Office of Criminal Justice Planning, overseeing California’s juvenile justice programs. He was a member of the State Advisory Group, Juvenile Justice Legislative Committee and Juvenile Justice Native American Committee.

Chen was appointed to serve as a Board Member for the California Physical Therapy Board and worked as a health deputy to former Los Angeles County Supervisor Michael D. Antonovich.

Chen also served as adjunct faculty at California State Fullerton from 2007-2008 and at California State University, Los Angeles in 2016.

Political career
Chen was elected in November 2011 to the Walnut Valley Unified School Board and re-elected to a second term in 2015.

In 2014, Chen ran for the California State Assembly.  He narrowly lost the Republican nomination to Diamond Bar City Councilwoman Ling Ling Chang, who went on to easily win the general election.

Chen was elected to the California State Assembly in November 2016, when Chang ran unsuccessfully for the California State Senate.  He was appointed to serve in leadership as Deputy Whip to the Assembly Republican Caucus.  His committee membership consists of the Banking and Finance Committee (where he serves as Vice-Chair), the Business and Professions Committee, the Insurance Committee, the Jobs, Economic Development and the Economy Committee, and the Utilities and Energy Committee.

In 2018, in the wake of California's growing mental health and homeless epidemic, Chen authored Assembly Bill 2156, which would clarify and fine tune the definition of “gravely disabled” to ensure that county investigators evaluate the mental capacity of an individual to provide for their own food, clothing, shelter, and medical care.

That same year, Chen introduced AB 3005 which aimed to protect the sensitive personal information of children in foster care which can be misused to commit various crimes, like fraud and identity theft.

Due to the increased number of crimes in 2019, Chen introduced AB 517 to create an Orange County Property Crime Task Force to prevent crimes as well as identify and arrest criminals who participate in property crimes.

To address the growing number of homeless encampments found beneath our state highways, Chen introduced AB 1908, the Homeless Encampment and Litter Program (HELP), putting more accountability on Caltrans in coordinating access to housing and supportive services for those who need it most.

In an effort to preserve open space in Southern California, Chen introduced AB 2021 which would require the California Department of Parks and Recreation to seek opportunities for acquiring land to expand open space by entering discussions to grow the size of Chino Hills State Park, a landmark that sits at the junction of four of California's most populous counties - Orange, San Bernardino, Los Angeles, and Riverside.

In 2021, Chen was able to secure funding via a state budget allocation for a pedestrian bridge that is critical to safeguarding university students, faculty and staff and community members at Cal State University of Fullerton. The Titan Gateway Pedestrian Bridge, which will allow the campus community to cross over Nutwood Avenue, connecting the main campus to CSUF's College Park building, approximately 22,000 to 26,000 vehicles traverse this intersection every week. The crossing is particularly dangerous for the more than 1,700 students with visual, hearing or mobility disabilities served by Disability Support Services at Cal State Fullerton, any of whom need access to College Park for classes and campus resources. Chen said “the million-dollar allocation from the State General fund is specifically for the Titan Gateway. As a CSUF alumnus, Chen added that although CSUF is not in his district, many students are constituents in his district, and it was great to return and continue to invest in the students.”

2014 California State Assembly 

Chang was elected to the California Assembly in the 55th district in 2014 and had five bills signed into law in her first seven months in office. She also proposed bills seeking to cut business regulations.

2016 California State Assembly

2018 California State Assembly

2020

Personal life
Chen and his mother are small business owners who own and operate a property management company.  Chen's brother, David, is a deputy district attorney with the Santa Barbara County District Attorney's office.

References

External links 
 
 Campaign website
 Join California Phillip Chen

Asian American and Pacific Islander state legislators in California
Republican Party members of the California State Assembly
Living people
1978 births
21st-century American politicians
American politicians of Taiwanese descent
California politicians of Chinese descent
University of Southern California alumni
California State University, Fullerton alumni
People from Whittier, California
People from Yorba Linda, California
Asian conservatism in the United States